Barry Eugene "Butch" Wilmore (born December 29, 1962) is a NASA astronaut and United States Navy test pilot. He has had two spaceflights, the first of which was an 11-day Space Shuttle mission in November 2009, to the International Space Station. Wilmore was designated as pilot with five other crew members on Space Shuttle Atlantis for the mission STS-129. He most recently served as part of Expedition 41 to the International Space Station.

Prior to being selected as a NASA astronaut in July 2000, Wilmore was an experienced Navy test pilot. He also participated in the development of the T-45 Goshawk jet trainer.

Personal life 
Wilmore was born in Murfreesboro, Tennessee, but was raised in Mount Juliet by his mother Faye and father Eugene. Wilmore has one sibling, a brother named Jack Wilmore, who resides in Franklin, Tennessee. He is married to the former Miss Deanna Newport of Helenwood, Tennessee. He also has two daughters, Daryn Wilmore and Logan Wilmore. Wilmore currently lives in Houston, Texas, with his family.

Education 
Wilmore graduated from Mount Juliet High School in Mount Juliet, Tennessee. Wilmore has received a Bachelor of Science and a Master of Science degree from Tennessee Tech in electrical engineering, and a Master of Science in Aviation Systems from the University of Tennessee. Mr. Wilmore was a member, letterman and team captain of the Tennessee Technological University football team.

Military experience 
Wilmore has over 6,200 hours of flight time and 663 carrier landings, all in tactical jet aircraft, and is a graduate of the United States Naval Test Pilot School (USNTPS).

He has flown missions in support of Operations Desert Shield, Desert Storm and Southern Watch over the skies of Iraq, as well as missions over Bosnia in support of United States and NATO interests. Wilmore successfully completed 21 combat missions during Operation Desert Storm while operating from USS John F. Kennedy. Wilmore's most recent operational deployment was aboard USS Dwight D. Eisenhower with the "Blue Blasters" of Strike Fighter Squadron 34 (VFA-34), an F/A-18 squadron based at Naval Air Station Oceana, Virginia.

As a Navy test pilot Wilmore participated in all aspects of the initial development of the T-45 jet trainer to include initial carrier landing certification and high angle of attack flight tests. His test tour also included a stint at USNTPS as a systems and fixed wing "Flight Test" instructor. Prior to his selection to NASA, Wilmore was on exchange to the Air Force as a "Flight Test" instructor at the U.S. Air Force Test Pilot School at Edwards Air Force Base, California.

NASA experience 

Wilmore was selected as a pilot by NASA in July 2000 and reported for training that August 2000. Following the completion of two years of training and evaluation, Wilmore was assigned technical duties representing the Astronaut Office on all propulsion systems issues including the Space Shuttle Main Engines, solid rocket motor, external tank, and also served on the astronaut support team that traveled to the Kennedy Space Center, Florida, in support of launch and landing operations.

STS-129 

Expedition 41/42 
Wilmore returned to space in September 2014 as a member of the Soyuz TMA-14M long duration International Space Station crew. During this mission, humans manufactured off world for the very first time. The International Space Station's 3-D printer, designed and built by Made In Space, Inc., was used to print a tool with a design file transmitted from the ground to the printer. The tool was a ratchet wrench needed by Wilmore, who would have had to wait for the tool to be delivered on the next supply mission from Earth. The wrench was later returned to the ground for analysis and testing, along with the other parts printed in space.

Boeing Crewed Flight Test 
On October 7, 2020, NASA and Boeing announced Barry E. Wilmore would join astronauts Mike Fincke and Nicole Mann for NASA's Boeing Crew Flight Test, the inaugural crewed flight of the CST-100 Starliner launching to the International Space Station in 2021. On April 18, 2022, NASA said that it has not finalized which of the cadre of Starliner astronauts, including Wilmore, Michael Fincke, and Sunita Williams, will fly on the Crewed Flight Test mission or the first operational Starliner mission. On June 16, 2022, NASA confirmed that CFT will be a two person flight test, consisting of Wilmore and Wlliams.

Awards and honors 
Barry Wilmore has received numerous medals, awards and honors. These include the Navy Meritorious Service Medal, the Air Medal (5), 3 with the Combat "V" designation, the Navy Commendation Medal (6), 3 of which also hold the Combat "V" designation, the Navy Achievement Medal (2), and numerous Unit decorations. He has also received the Aviation Officer Candidate School (AOCS) "Distinguished Naval Graduate" award. He is also on the Initial Naval Flight Training "Commodore's List With Distinction". He has also won the U.S. Atlantic Fleet "Light Attack Wing One – Pilot Of The Year" (1991) and U.S. Atlantic Fleet "Strike Fighter Aviator of the Year" (1999). Wilmore is the recipient of the Strike Fighter Wing Atlantic "Scott Speicher Award" for Weapons Employment Excellence (1998). In 2003, Barry Wilmore was inducted to the Tennessee Technological University "Sports Hall of Fame".

See also 

 A Beautiful Planet – IMAX documentary film showing scenes of Earth which features Wilmore and other ISS astronauts.

References

External links 

 NASA bio
 Spacefacts biography of Barry E. Wilmore

1962 births
Living people
United States Navy astronauts
People from Murfreesboro, Tennessee
People from Mount Juliet, Tennessee
Tennessee Tech Golden Eagles football players
University of Tennessee alumni
United States Naval Test Pilot School alumni
United States Navy captains
United States Naval Aviators
Commanders of the International Space Station
American test pilots
United States Navy personnel of the Gulf War
Recipients of the Air Medal
Crew members of the International Space Station
Space Shuttle program astronauts
Spacewalkers